Events from the year 1415 in France.

Incumbents
 Monarch – Charles VI

Events
 18 August – The siege of Harfleur begins during the Hundred Years War
 25 October – Henry V leads English forces to victory at the Battle of Agincourt

Births
 Unknown – Jeanne de Bar, Countess of Marle and Soissons, noblewoman (died 1462)

Deaths
 25 October – Jean I, Duke of Alençon, nobleman, killed at Agincourt (born 1385)
 25 October – Charles I of Albret, Constable of France, killed at Agincourt (born 1368)
 25 October – Philip II, Count of Nevers, nobleman, killed at Agincourt (born 1389)
 25 October – Frederick I, Count of Vaudémont, nobleman, killed at Agincourt (born 1371)
 9 November – Pierre Girard, cardinal 
 18 December – Louis, Duke of Guyenne, nobleman (born 1397)

References

1410s in France